Jan Burke (born August 1, 1953) is an American author of novels and short stories. She is a winner of the Edgar Award for Best Novel, the Agatha for Best Short Story, the Macavity, and Ellery Queen Readers Award.

Bio
Burke was born August 1, 1953, in Houston, Texas, but has lived in Southern California most of her life. She attended California State University, Long Beach, and graduated with a degree in history. She is a distinguished alumna of CSULB.

She worked as a researcher on an oral history project interviewing "Rosie the Riveters." Later she became the manager of a manufacturing plant for a large corporation.

She completed her first novel, Goodnight, Irene, in the evenings after work. It was sold unagented and unsolicited to Simon & Schuster. She received a surprising boost from a new fan when, during his first White House interview after taking office, President Bill Clinton 
said he was reading Goodnight, Irene.

Her books have been on bestseller lists of the New York Times, USA Today and other publications. They have been published internationally and have been optioned for film and television.

Burke became active in raising awareness of the problems facing crime labs and the need to obtain better funding for forensic science, at one point founding a nonprofit to do so. She has also been an advocate for the improvement of medicolegal death investigation in the U.S. and for requiring the reporting of unidentified remains to NamUs. Working with missing persons advocates, she helped to get legislation passed in New York State, the first state to require Namus reporting by all coroners and medical examiners. Other states have followed this model. She has been a speaker at meetings of the National Institute of Justice, the American Society of Crime Lab Directors, the California Association of Criminalists, the California Association of Crime Lab Directors, and other forensic science organizations. She has served on the honorary board of the California Forensic Science Institute.

Burke has been the Guest of Honor at several mystery fan conventions, including Malice Domestic, Left Coast Crime, and Mayhem in the Midwest.

Illness in her family has taken her away from writing in recent years.

Novels
Irene Kelly Mysteries:
 Goodnight, Irene (1993)
 Sweet Dreams, Irene (1994)
 Dear Irene (1995)
 Remember Me, Irene (1996)
 Hocus (1997)
 Liar (1998)
 Bones (2000)
 Flight (2001) (from the POV of Frank Harriman)
 Bloodlines (2005)
 Kidnapped (2006)
 Disturbance (2011)

Other novels
 Nine (2002)
 18 (2003) collection of short stories
 The Messenger (2009)

Contributions
Burke edited the first edition of Breaking and Entering, a Sisters in Crime's guide to getting
published. She served as an Associate Editor on Writing Mysteries: A Handbook by the Mystery Writers of America, edited by Sue Grafton. She has served on the national boards of Mystery Writers of America and the American Crime Writers League. She is a past president of the Southern California Chapter of Mystery Writers of America (MWA).

 

Burke's novel Bloodlines appears in the television series Bones:  Season 1, Ep. 17 - The Skull in the Desert.  It is used as a prop on a table at minute 15:05.

Awards and nominations
Edgar Award 
 1999 Best Novel Bones.
Edgar nomination 
 2001 Best Short Story  The Abbey Ghosts 
Agatha Award 
 2001 Best Short Story The Man in the Civil SuitAgatha Nominations 
 1997 Best Novel - Hocus 1998 Best Novel - Liar 2002 Best Short Story Devotion 2002 Best Non-fiction,  Writing Mysteries (Sue Grafton and Barry Zeman)Macavity Awards 
 1995 Best Short Story Unharmed Best Mystery Short Story: "The Abbey Ghosts"
Macavity nominations 
 1998 Best Novel Liar 1997 Best Novel Hocus 2003 Best Mystery Novel NineEllery Queen Mystery Magazine Reader's Award. 
Romantic Times's Career Achievement Award for Contemporary Suspense

Anthony Award nominations
 1994 Best First Novel Goodnight, Irene 1999 Best Short Story Two Bits 2002 Best Novel Flight 2000 Best Novel Bones 2006 Best Novel BloodlinesBarry Nominations 
 2006 Best Novel, Bloodlines 1998 Best Novel Hocus''

References

External links
Jan Burke's official website
Jan Burke on Twitter

Agatha Award winners
American mystery writers
20th-century American novelists
California State University, Long Beach alumni
Edgar Award winners
Living people
Macavity Award winners
1953 births
People from Houston
21st-century American novelists
American women novelists
American women short story writers
Women mystery writers
20th-century American women writers
21st-century American women writers
20th-century American short story writers
21st-century American short story writers